Cornelius Joseph Ryan (February 27, 1920 – January 3, 1996) was an American professional baseball second baseman, third baseman, coach and manager who served as interim manager of two Major League Baseball teams, the  Atlanta Braves and the  Texas Rangers. 

During his playing days, Ryan appeared in 1,184 games over 12 MLB seasons, and compiled a lifetime batting average of .248 with 988 career hits (among them 58 home runs) with the New York Giants, Boston Braves, Cincinnati Reds / Redlegs, Philadelphia Phillies and Chicago White Sox. 

On April 16, 1953, Ryan (then with the Phillies) made six hits in six at bats in a 14–12 loss to Pittsburgh, tying a then-Major League record. Ryan's safeties included two doubles; he scored three runs and had one run batted in.

Ryan spent much of his baseball career in the Braves organization, working for them in three different cities: as a player in Boston (he was a utility infielder for the 1948 National League champions); a coach and minor league manager for Milwaukee during the late 1950s (he was the third-base coach on Fred Haney's staff during the Braves' 1957 world championship season); and as a coach (1971; 1973–74), interim manager (1975) and scout for the Atlanta club during the 1970s. Ryan succeeded Clyde King as skipper of the Atlanta Braves on August 30, 1975, and guided the team to a record of 9–18 over the final 27 games of the season.

In 1977, Ryan began the season as a coach with the Texas Rangers. Texas manager Frank Lucchesi was replaced by Eddie Stanky, a teammate of Ryan's on the 1948–49 Braves, on June 22. Stanky resigned after one game, and Ryan served as interim manager for six games (with Texas winning two) from June 23 to 27. The Rangers signed Billy Hunter, the longtime Baltimore Orioles third-base coach, as their permanent manager. Ryan's career managerial mark was 11–22 (.333).  He remained a Rangers' coach through 1979.

During the 1960s, Ryan also spent several seasons as a scout and minor league manager with the Houston Astros and briefly worked with the Kansas City A's.

He died at age 75 in Metairie, Louisiana.

See also
List of Major League Baseball single-game hits leaders

References

External links

Connie Ryan at SABR (Baseball BioProject)

1920 births
1996 deaths
Atlanta Braves coaches
Atlanta Braves managers
Atlanta Braves scouts
Atlanta Crackers players
Austin Senators players
Baseball players from New Orleans
Boston Braves players
Chicago White Sox players
Cincinnati Redlegs players
Cincinnati Reds players
Corpus Christi Clippers players
Houston Astros scouts
Jersey City Giants players
Kansas City Athletics scouts
Louisiana State University alumni
Louisville Colonels (minor league) players
Major League Baseball second basemen
Major League Baseball third base coaches
Milwaukee Braves coaches
National League All-Stars
New York Giants (NL) players
Savannah Indians players
Philadelphia Phillies players
Texas Rangers coaches
Texas Rangers managers
Texas Rangers scouts
Jesuit High School (New Orleans) alumni